In musical tuning systems, the hexany, invented by Erv Wilson, represents one of the simplest structures found in his combination product sets.

It is referred to as an uncentered structure, meaning that it implies no tonic. It achieves this by using consonant relations as opposed to the dissonance methods normally employed by atonality. While it is often and confusingly overlapped with the Euler–Fokker genus, the subsequent stellation of Wilson's combination product sets (CPS) are outside of that Genus. The Euler Fokker Genus fails to see 1 as a possible member of a set except as a starting point.  The numbers of vertices of his combination sets follow the numbers in Pascal's triangle. In this construction, the hexany is the third cross-section of the four-factor set and the first uncentered one. hexany is the name that Erv Wilson gave to the six notes in the 2-out-of-4 combination product set, abbreviated as 2*4 CPS.

Simply, the hexany is the 2 out of 4 set. It is constructed by taking any four factors and a set of two at a time, then multiplying them in pairs. For instance, the harmonic factors 1, 3, 5 and 7 are combined in pairs of 1*3, 1*5, 1*7, 3*5, 3*7, 5*7, resulting in 1, 3, 5, 7 Hexanies. The notes are usually octave shifted to place them all within the same octave, which has no effect on interval relations and the consonance of the triads. The possibility of an octave being a solution is not outside of Wilson's conception and is used in cases of placing larger combination product sets upon Generalized Keyboards.

The hexany can be thought of as analogous to the octahedron. The notes are arranged so that each point represents a pitch, each edge an interval and each face a triad. It thus has eight just intonation triads where each triad has two notes in common with three of the other chords. Each triad occurs just once with its inversion represented by the opposing 3 tones. The edges of the octahedron show musical intervals between the vertices, usually chosen to be consonant intervals from the harmonic series. The points represent musical notes, and the three notes that make each of the triangular faces represent musical triads. Wilson also pointed out and explored the idea of melodic Hexanies.

Tuning

This shows the three dimensional version of the hexany.

The hexany is the figure containing both the triangles shown as well as the connecting lines between them.

In this 2D construction the interval relationships are the same. See also figure two of Kraig Grady's paper.

For example, the face with vertices 3×5, 1×5, 5×7 is an otonal (major type) chord since it can be written as 5×(1, 3, 7), using low numbered harmonics. The 5×7, 3×7, 3×5 is a utonal (minor type) chord since it can be written as 3×5×7×(1/3, 1/5, 1/7), using low-numbered subharmonics.

To make this into a conventional harmonic construct with 1/1 as the first note, all the notes are first reduced to the octave. Since the harmonic construct as Erv called it as he did not consider it a scale and it does not have a 1/1 yet, any note chosen can be used to divide every note up to octave reduction. The ratios' notation here shows the ratios of the frequencies of the notes. If the 1/1 is 500 hertz, then 6/5 is 600 hertz, and so forth.

Relationship to Pascal's triangle 

The complete row of Pascal's triangle for the hypercube in this construction runs 1 (single vertex), 4 (tetrahedron tetrad), 6 (hexany), 4 (another tetrad), 1. The idea generalises to other numbers of dimensions, for instance, the cross-sections of a five-dimensional cube give two versions of the dekany, a ten-note scale rich in tetrads, triads and dyads, which also contains many hexanies. In six dimensions the same construction gives the twenty-note eikosany, which is even richer in chords. It has pentads, tetrads, and triads as well as hexanies and dekanies.

In the case of the three-dimensional cube, it is usual to consider the entire cube as a single eight-note scale, the octany – the cross-sections then are 1, 3 (triad), 3 (another triad), 1, taken along any of the four main diagonals of the cube.

Coordinates for the Pascal's triangle of combination product sets

First row (square): 
00
10 01
11

Second row :
000
100 010 001 triad (triangle)
110 101 011 triad (triangle)
111

Third row 
0000
1000 0100 0010 0001 tetrad (tetrahedron or 3-simplex)
1100 1010 1001 0110 0101 0011 hexany (octahedron)
1110 1101 1011 0111 tetrad
1111

The octahedron there is the edge dual of the tetrahedron, or rectified tetrahedron

Fourth row 
00000
10000 01000 00100 00010 00001 pentad (4-simplex or pentachoron – four-dimensional tetrahedron)
11000 10100 10010 10001 01100 01010 01001 00110 00101 00011 2)5 dekany (10 vertices, rectified 4-simplex)
00111 01011 01101 01110 10011 10101 10110 11001 11010 11100 3)5 dekany (10 vertices)
01111 10111 11011 11101 11110 pentad
11111

The rectified 4-simplex which is the mathematical name for the geometrical shape of the dekany is also known as the dispentachoron

Fifth row 
000000
100000 010000 001000 000100 000010 000001 hexad (5-simplex or hexateron – five-dimensional tetrahedron)
110000 101000 100100 100010 100001 011000 010100 010010 010001 001100 001010 001001 000110 000101 000011 2)6 pentadekany (15 vertices, rectified  5-simplex)
111000 110100 110010 110001 101100 101010 101001 100110 100101 100011
011100 011010 011001 010110 010101 010011 001110 001101 001011 000111 eikosany (20 vertices birectified 5-simplex)
001111 010111 011011 011101 011110 100111 101011 101101 101110 110011 110101 110110 111001 111010 111100 4)6 pentadekany (15 vertices)
011111 101111 110111 111011 111101 111110 hexad
111111

The dekany is the edge dual of the 4-simplex. Similarly, the geometrical figure for the pentadekany is the edge dual of the 5-simplex. A dekany cam be made by joining together the midpoints of the edges of the 4-simplex, and similarly for the pentadekany and the 5-simplex.

Similarly the dekany vertices when scaled by 1/2 move to the midpoints of the 4-simplex edges, and the pentadekany vertices move to the midpoints of the 5-simplex edges, and so on in all higher dimensions.

The eikosany vertices when scaled by a 1/3 move to the centres of the 2D faces of the 5-simplex. In a 3D cube 111 when scaled by 1/3 moves to the midpoint of 100 010 001, where each edge vector subtends the same distance along the long diagonal of the cube. 11100 moves to the centre of the equilateral triangle with cords 10000 01000 00100 and similarly for all the other eikosany vertices.

The geometric figure for the eikosany is the face dual of the 5-simplex or birectified 5-simplex, the dual of its 2D faces, as it also has 3D and 4D facets.

It is a similar picture for the 3)7, 3)8 etc. figures in all higher dimensions.

Similarly in eight dimensions, the figure obtained from using all permutations of 4 out of 8 is the 3D face dual of the 7-simplex, or 3-rectified 7-simplex since 1111 scaled by 1/4 moves to the centre of the 3D regular tetrahedron face 1000 0100 0010 0001, and so on.

In music

Composers including Kraig Grady, Daniel James Wolf, and Joseph Pehrson have used pitch structures based on hexanies.

See also
Euler–Fokker genus

References

Further reading
 

  (see the Background section)

External links
"Some hexany and hexany Diamond Lattices (and Blanks)", The Wilson Archives. Original hexany papers showing different facets and configurations, not assembled by Erv Wilson (1967 on)
"The Wilson Archives", Anaphoria.com
"hexany", RobertInventor.com. With a hexany you can turn around and click on any of its vertices, edges, or faces to hear the chords.
"Combination-Product Set Patterns", Xenharmonikon IX (1986) by Kraig Grady.
"Eikosany Papers", Anaphoria.com.
"Musical Geometry", Music and Virtual Flowers. Intro. to musical geometry.
"The Tumbling Dekany", "Unusual musical scales", Dave Keenan's Home Page. Dave Keenan's Dekany tumbling in 4 dimensions — as a musical Excel spreadsheet

Multi-dimensional geometry
Just tuning and intervals
Hexatonic scales
Hexachords